The Linkava is a river of Kėdainiai district municipality and Panevėžys district municipality, central Lithuania.

It starts 4 km from Ramygala, nearby Vaidilai village. The Rudekšna flows to the southwest, later to the north west and meets the Nevėžis river (from the left side) in Krekenava. The bed width is 6-12, at some places 14-22 meters, the depth is 0.5-3 meters. The river course from Butrimoniai village has been left intact and now belongs to Krekenava Regional Park.
 
The name Linkava derives from the root *link- as in Lithuanian linka ('hollow, dip'), linkis ('curve, bay'), linkti ('to bend').

References

Rivers of Lithuania
Kėdainiai District Municipality
Panevėžys District Municipality